The 1900–01 season was the ninth in the history of the Western Football League.

Portsmouth were the new champions of Division One, and also competed in the Southern League during this season, along with all the other members of Division One. The new clubs from London dominated the season, although Bristol City were elected to the Football League, being the first Western League club to achieve this. The Division Two champions for the second season running were Bristol East.

Division One
Six new clubs joined Division One, which was increased to nine clubs from four after Bedminster merged with Bristol City.
Millwall Athletic
Portsmouth
Queens Park Rangers
Tottenham Hotspur
Reading and Southampton rejoined from the Southern League Division One though, like the other clubs, they played in both leagues.

Division Two
Three new clubs joined Division Two, which was increased to eight clubs from five. It was the first season not to be fully completed, with several games remaining unplayed at the end of the season.
Bedminster St Francis
Paulton Rovers, also playing in the Somerset Senior League
Weston-super-Mare

References

1900-01
1900–01 in English association football leagues